The Arabian red fox (Vulpes vulpes arabica) is a subspecies of the red fox native to the Arabian Peninsula, specifically the Hajar and Dhofar Mountains in Oman, as well as the UAE, Syria, Jordan,  Saudi Arabia and Yemen. It has also been reported from Iraq and Palestine.

Characteristics
The Arabian red fox is similar in color to the common red fox. However, this fox is more adapted to desert life than its parent species, with its ears being much larger, and its body being much smaller than that of the red fox. The Arabian red fox also has fur between its toes, to prevent burning of the feet.

Behaviour and ecology
This fox is a mostly solitary animal, but may form loosely-knit social groups of a few individuals. They are nomadic, temporarily occupying defined home ranges. Its diet consists of rodents, birds, and fish as well as some desert vegetation or even carrion. They are most active at night. The small foxes open the eyes after 10 days from birth. Arabian foxes live in various environments, including mountains, coasts, deserts, and cities.

References

External links
 Residents spot foxes in their neighbourhood and close to homes in Dubai (Gulf News)

Vulpes
Fauna of Jordan
Mammals of the Arabian Peninsula
Mammals of the Middle East
Fauna of Syria
Fauna of Palestine (region)
Taxa named by Oldfield Thomas